Theodore John Conrad (July 10, 1949 – May 18, 2021) was a bank teller who stole $215,000 (equivalent to $ million in ) in cash from the vault of a Cleveland bank in July 1969. He admitted to the crime but was never apprehended or convicted. He assumed the name of Thomas Randele and lived in Massachusetts for most of his life after the theft. Conrad avoided capture for more than five decades. Shortly after his death, his identity was discovered by the son of one of the original investigators using details from the obituary of Thomas Randele.

Early life 
Conrad was born in Denver, Colorado, the son of Edward and Ruthabeth Conrad. His parents divorced while Conrad was in elementary school. He moved with his mother and sister to Lakewood, Ohio after the divorce and attended Lakewood High School, graduating in 1967. He was popular in high school and was elected to the student council, and was very bright, with an IQ of 135. He went on to attend New England College, where his father, a retired captain in the Navy, was an assistant professor of political science. He left the college after one semester and attended Cuyahoga Community College.

Theft and flight 
In early 1969, Conrad went to work at the Society National Bank headquarters at 127 Public Square in Cleveland. He worked in the cash vault as a teller, and his job involved “packaging money to be delivered to Society branches around town. It was a position for a trusted employee.” According to a summary report compiled years later by the U.S. Marshals Service, "To all appearances, Conrad was that All-American boy whose character was not questioned and seemed to be a model of responsibility during a turbulent time."

On  Friday, July 11, 1969, Conrad, then 20 years old, went to the vault and stuffed $215,000 in cash (equivalent to $ million in ) into a paper bag and walked off with it. The loss was discovered only the following Monday, giving him a two-day head start to flee and hide. There was little security at the bank, and Conrad had never been fingerprinted. Immediately after his disappearance was discovered, a warrant was issued for his arrest on charges of embezzlement and misappropriating funds. In September 1969, Conrad was indicted in federal court on charges of embezzlement and making a false entry in the records of the bank.

Prior to the theft, Conrad had been obsessed with the 1968 film The Thomas Crown Affair, starring Steve McQueen as a millionaire bank robber. Conrad "saw it more than a half dozen times" and "bragged to his friends about how easy it would be to take money from the bank and even told them he planned to do so". In 1969, Conrad confessed to his role in the theft in a letter to his girlfriend and expressed regret for the crime.

Conrad first went to Washington D.C. after the theft before moving to Los Angeles and, in 1970, settling in Massachusetts. After moving to the state, Conrad assumed the name "Thomas Randele". He married in 1982 and the couple had a daughter. He worked as a golf pro at the Pembroke Country Club, rising to manager, and worked for luxury automotive dealerships for 40 years. He was well-liked by local police and led a law-abiding life. This, and the lack of fingerprints, hampered the hunt for him.

Investigation and postmortem discovery 
While Conrad raised his family in Massachusetts, law enforcement was hunting unsuccessfully for him. Agents from all FBI field offices joined in the search, compiling notes and documentation that filled 20 binders. The search for Conrad spanned 52 years, as investigators followed leads that took them to Washington D.C., Inglewood, California, West Texas, Oregon, and Honolulu. The case was featured on the true crime television programs America’s Most Wanted and Unsolved Mysteries.

The hunt for Conrad went on for so long that one of the deputy U.S. marshals involved in the original investigation, John K. Elliott, was succeeded on the case by his son Peter J. Elliott, who became U.S. Marshal of the Northern District of Ohio in 2003. John Elliott retired in 1990 and never stopped hunting for Conrad. He died in March 2020.

Conrad had died of lung cancer on May 18, 2021, telling his family his real identity on his deathbed. Elliott was tipped off to Conrad's whereabouts by an obituary for Randele, which listed his birth date as July 10, 1947, exactly two years earlier than his real birth date of July 10, 1949. His parents' first names in the obituary, Edward and Ruthabeth, and college, New England College, were the same as Conrad's, and his mother's maiden name of Krueger was the same as well. Conrad's signature, obtained by investigators from a college application, was also highly similar to Randele's. His family will not be charged for not alerting authorities to his confession. Elliott has not disclosed how he learned of the obituary.

References

External links 
 Obituary, Thomas Randele, The Boston Globe, May 21, 2021

Embezzlement
Fugitives wanted by the United States
1949 births
2021 deaths
People from Lynnfield, Massachusetts
People from Lakewood, Ohio
People from Denver
Deaths from lung cancer in Massachusetts